Josef A. Riemer (born 21 March 1950) is an Austrian politician who has been a Member of the National Council for the Freedom Party of Austria (FPÖ) since 2010.

References

1950 births
Living people
Members of the National Council (Austria)
Freedom Party of Austria politicians